The 1987 New England Patriots season was the franchise's 18th season in the National Football League and 28th overall. They failed to improve on their 11–5 record from 1986, in the strike-shortened season, finishing 8–7, tied for second in the AFC East Division, and missing the playoffs for the first time since 1984.

Offseason

NFL draft

Personnel

Staff

NFL replacement players
After the league decided to use replacement players during the NFLPA strike, the following team was assembled:

Roster

Regular season

Schedule

Season summary

Week 1

Miami Dolphins punter Reggie Roby injured in the game, forcing Don Strock to punt in the emergency situation.  Additionally, with 2:22 left in the game Dan Marino was injured forcing Strock to fill in at the quarterback position as well, nearly mounting a winning comeback drive.

Standings

References

See also
List of New England Patriots seasons

New England Patriots
New England Patriots seasons
New England Patriots
Sports competitions in Foxborough, Massachusetts